Immigration and Nationality  may refer to:

Immigration and Nationality Act (disambiguation)
Immigration and Nationality Act of 1952
Immigration and Nationality Act of 1965
Immigration and Nationality Act Section 287(g)
Immigration and Nationality Directorate
Immigration and Nationality Law Review